Tirupati–Sainagar Shirdi Express is an Express train belonging to Indian Railways which connects Tirupati in Andhra Pradesh with Shirdi in Maharashtra.

Service 
It operates as train number 17417 from Tirupati to Sainagar Shirdi and as train number 17418 in the reverse direction, serving the states of Andhra Pradesh, Karnataka, Telangana & Maharashtra .

Coaches

The 14717 / 18 Tirupati–Sainagar Shirdi Express has one AC 2-tier, two AC 3-tier, seven sleeper class, six general unreserved & two SLR (seating with luggage rake) coaches . It carries a pantry car.

As with most train services in India, coach composition may be amended at the discretion of Indian Railways depending on demand.

Routeing

Traction
As this route is going to be electrified, a Gooty-based diesel WDP-4 loco pulls the train to its destination.

References

Transport in Shirdi
Transport in Tirupati
Railway services introduced in 2015
Express trains in India
Rail transport in Telangana
Rail transport in Maharashtra
Rail transport in Andhra Pradesh
Rail transport in Karnataka